Brookesia nana, also known as the nano-chameleon, is a species of chameleon endemic to montane rainforests in northern Madagascar. Described in 2021, it could represent the world's smallest reptile. Unlike some chameleons, Brookesia nana does not change colors. 

The species was discovered by herpetologist Frank Glaw and other German researchers in 2021 in the rainforest on the Sorata massif in northern Madagascar. Brookesia nana is not arboreal, as it tends to inhabit the forest floor. It is likely that the species is endangered due to deforestation in Madagascar. Miniaturism is believed to evolve from habitat loss.

Description 
The nano-chameleon is blotchy brown in color. Adult males measure 22 mm (0.87 inch) in total length (including tail), while females are slightly larger at 29 mm (1.1 inches). Like other Brookesia species, females are generally larger than the males. The reasons for its diminutive size are currently unknown, as many vertebrates grow as they mature.

References 

Brookesia
 Lizards of Africa
 Reptiles of Madagascar
 Endemic fauna of Madagascar
 Reptiles described in 2021
Taxa named by Frank Glaw
 Taxa named by Mark D. Scherz
 Taxa named by Andolalao Rakotoarison
 Taxa named by Miguel Vences